During the 1982–83 season, Heart of Midlothian F.C. competed in the Scottish First Division, the Scottish Cup and the Scottish League Cup.

Fixtures

Friendlies

League Cup

Scottish Cup

Scottish First Division

Scottish First Division table

Squad information

See also
List of Heart of Midlothian F.C. seasons

References

Statistical Record 82-83

External links
Official Club website

Heart of Midlothian F.C. seasons
Heart of Midlothian